Cheesetown is an unincorporated community in Franklin County, in the U.S. state of Pennsylvania.

History
Cheesetown was laid out around 1840.

References

Unincorporated communities in Franklin County, Pennsylvania
Unincorporated communities in Pennsylvania